Padborg Park is a motor racing circuit in Padborg, Denmark. The circuit opened in 2003 on the site of an airfield. The circuit has regularly hosted rounds of the Danish Touringcar Championship (DTC), TCR Denmark Touring Car Series, Super GT Denmark and F4 Danish Championship. It is also is used daily for testing and track days.

Lap records

The official race lap records at the Padborg Park are listed as:

References

External links 
 

Motorsport venues in Denmark
Aabenraa Municipality